Anastasia Pavlyuchenkova was the defending champion, but withdrew before the tournament began.

Dayana Yastremska won the title, defeating Caroline Garcia in the final 6–4, 5–7, 7–6(7–3). Yastremska saved a match point Garcia had against her in the third set in the final before winning the title.

Seeds

Draw

Finals

Top half

Bottom half

Qualifying

Seeds

Qualifiers

Lucky loser

Draw

First qualifier

Second qualifier

Third qualifier

Fourth qualifier

Fifth qualifier

Sixth qualifier

References

External Links 
Main Draw
Qualifying Draw

Internationaux de Strasbourg - Singles
2019 Singles